was a Japanese track and field athlete. She was the world record holder in several events in the 1920s – 1930s and was the first Japanese woman to win an Olympic medal. She was also the first woman to represent Japan at the Olympics.

Biography
Hitomi was born in what is now part of Okayama City. In November 1923 during the 2nd Okayama Prefectural Women’s Games, she set an unofficial national record of 4m67 in the long jump event. In April 1924, Hitomi entered what is now the Japan Women's College of Physical Education. She returned to Okayama in October 1924 to participate in the 3rd Okayama Prefectural Women’s Games, where she set an unofficial world record of 10m33 in the triple jump event. She bested this record the following month at the 1924 Meiji Shrine Games in Tokyo, with a distance of 11m35 and also set an unofficial world record for the Javelin throw of 26m37.

In October 1925, Hitomi participated in the 4th Osaka Games, winning first place in the 50 metres event, and again besting her unofficial world record for the triple jump with a distance of 11m62. In the 1925 Meiji Shrine Games in Tokyo, she won both the 50 metres event and the triple jump.

In April 1926, Hitomi went to work for the Osaka Mainichi Shimbun newspaper. In May, she set new unofficial national records for the long jump (5m06), shot put (10m39), 100m hurdles (15m4) at the 3rd Women’s Olympics held by the newspaper at Miyoshino. In June, in a completion sponsored by the Tokyo Mainichi Shimbun newspaper, she set new unofficial national records for the long jump (5m75) and the 4 × 100 metres relay (52s2).

In August 1926, Hitomi was selected to attend the "2èmes Jeux mondiaux féminins FSFI" games at Gothenburg, Sweden as the only Japanese woman athlete. She travelled by the Trans-Siberian Railway alone to Moscow, where a reporter from the Mainichi Shimbun met her and escorted her to Sweden. Competing in a total of six events, she received a gold medal for the long jump, with a distance of 5m50, setting a new official world record, as well as a gold medal for the standing long jump (2m49), silver medal for the discus throw (32m61) and bronze medal for the 100-yard dash (12.0 seconds). She also received an honorary prize from Alice Milliat, president of Fédération Sportive Féminine Internationale (FSFI) for the most individual points at 15.

In May 1927, at the 3rd Women’s Athletic Meet at Meiji Shrine in Tokyo, Hitomi set two new unofficial world records for the 200-meter run (26.1 seconds) and the standing jump (2m61).  She also tied the world record for the 100-meter run at a meet in Osaka in June. At a meet in Tokyo in October of the same year, she unofficially tied the world record for the 50-meter sprint (6.4 seconds) as well as the 100-meter sprint (12.4 seconds). 
Hitomi continued to set unofficial new world records in early 1928, with the 400-meter run (59.0 seconds) and 100-meter sprint (12.4 seconds) in Tokyo. At the Olympic qualifying event in Osaka, she set new official world records for the long jump (5m98) and the 100-meter spring (12.0 seconds), and was one of the first women to be included into a Japanese Olympic Team.

During the 1928 Summer Olympics in Amsterdam, Hitomi was the only Japanese woman athlete to compete. She entered the 100m, discus, and high jump individual events but had been concentrating most on the 100m. However, she lost this event in semifinals. She then decided to join 800m in haste (she hadn't run an 800m race at any official competition until that time), and as last-minute entries were still permitted, she was allowed to compete. Hitomi ran 2:26.2 in the preliminary and received a silver medal in the final with a time of 2:17.6, in a race won by Lina Radke in 2:16.8. She became the first Japanese woman to win an Olympic medal.

In April 1929 Hitomi achieved 217 points in the triathlon (100m, high jump, javelin) setting an unofficial world record at the 6th Japan Women’s Olympics at Miyoshino. In May, she set an official world record for the 200-meter run with a time 24.7 seconds in Tokyo. This was followed in October by new unofficial world records of 12.0 seconds for the 100m and 7.5 for the 60m sprint in Shenyang.

In early 1930, Hitomi was asked to lecture to women’s schools around the country. In July, she set new official national records for the long jump and javelin throw. In September, she participated in the "3èmes Jeux mondiaux féminins FSFI" games at Prague with five younger Japanese athletes. During this event, she won the gold medal for the long jump, silver medal for the triathlon and bronze medal for the javelin throw, despite suffering from a fever. She was also awarded a silver medal for her 12 individual points.

After the event, the Japanese team went on tour to Warsaw, Berlin, Brussels, Paris and London for competitions within the next half-month.
This extremely tough schedule took a toll on her health. Even after her return to Japan, she was asked to lecture, and visited sponsors and contributors in many Japanese cities without much rest. She was also surprised by the unexpected hostile reception to her athletic successes by the Japanese public. On March 25, 1931, she entered a hospital in Osaka under a false name to avoid publicity. Hitomi died from pneumonia on August 2, just three years after her Amsterdam Olympic 800m final.

See also
Idaten (TV series)
Japan at the 1928 Summer Olympics

References

Further reading

Christensen, Karen. International Encyclopedia of Women and Sports. Macmillan Reference USA, 2001.

External links

International Association of Athletics Federations
Official Website of the Olympic Movement
sporting-heroes.net
Mainichi Shimbun

1907 births
1931 deaths
Sportspeople from Okayama
Japanese female sprinters
Japanese female middle-distance runners
Japanese female long jumpers
Japanese female triple jumpers
Olympic female sprinters
Olympic female middle-distance runners
Olympic athletes of Japan
Olympic silver medalists for Japan
Olympic silver medalists in athletics (track and field)
Athletes (track and field) at the 1928 Summer Olympics
Medalists at the 1928 Summer Olympics
Women's World Games medalists
Japan Championships in Athletics winners
Deaths from pneumonia in Japan
20th-century Japanese women